The People's Democratic Party is a political party in Sierra Leone. 

The party won 1.0% of the popular vote and no seats in the 2002 general election.

Political parties in Sierra Leone